"Oinam" is a family name belonging to a branch of the Khuman dynasty of the Meitei ethnicity (Manipuri ethnicity). "Oinam Apokpa" ("Oinam Pokpa") is a clan ancestral deity worshipped by the people (members) of the family, following Meitei religion (Sanamahism).

Notable persons
 Oinam Bembem Devi (born 1980), Indian footballer
 Oinam Gautam Singh (born 1977), Indian film director and editor
 Oinam Lukhoi Singh, Indian politician
 John Oinam: Indian singer
 Oinam Doren: Indian film maker and director
 Oinam Gautam: film maker and director
 Oinam Nabakishore: Indian civil service officer and politician

References

Families
Indian surnames
Meitei surnames